Burketown is an isolated outback town and coastal locality in the Shire of Burke, Queensland, Australia.

Geography 
Burketown is located on the Albert River  to the north west of the state capital, Brisbane, with the nearest larger town being Normanton,  to the east, and the nearest city being Mount Isa,  to the south.

The town is the administrative centre of the Burke Shire Council.

History

Aboriginal History
Aboriginal Australian peoples had inhabited the region for millennia before European explorers travelled the area. The Yukulta / Ganggalidda and Garawa peoples are recognised as the traditional owners of the Burketown area. Native title was recognised on 1 April 2015.

A mission was established in 1930 at Burketown by Len and Dorothy Akehurst, who were members of the Christian Brethren.

Prior to the establishment of Doomadgee Mission, many Aboriginal children in the Gulf region were removed to Mornington Island Mission and other missions and Aboriginal reserves further south. Queensland Government records indicate that over 160 people were removed from Burketown between 1900 and 1974.

Exploration
On 2 August 1841, Captain J. Lort Stokes was the first European to discover the mouth of a river, which he named the "Albert" after Albert, Prince Consort. Stokes' party ascended the river for a distance of 50 river miles in a long boat in a search of fresh water. Having followed a bumper wet season Stokes was greeted by endless grassy plains, which he named "The Plains of Promise" after a day of exploration. The area was originally named for the 'Plains of Promise' or 'Province of Albert' after Prince Albert, the Queen's Consort in 1841.

Town establishment
Burketown, or "Burke Town", was named in honour of explorer Robert O'Hara Burke, who died shortly after making the first recorded successful south-north crossing of the continent in 1860-1. The first European settlers arrived in the local region not long after Burke and partner William John Wills' expedition. By the mid-1860s, several cattle stations - including Gregory Downs, Floraville, and Donors Hill - had been founded inland from the present site of Burketown. Burketown was formally established in 1865 by Robert Towns, chiefly to serve as a port and supply centre for his extensive properties in the Gulf country. Towns chartered a small vessel the Jacmel Packet and on 12 June 1865 it arrived off the mouth of the Albert River. The goods were eventually landed on the present site of Burketown. Towns, a prominent Sydney pastoralist and financier, also established Townsville in the same year.

By September 1865 the population was about 40 and by October a store and a hotel were under construction, the balance of buildings were humpies. Rations and grog were plentiful but already one evil was noted: prices for goods were so high that some intended settlers could not stay. The town grew; however currency, both notes and coins, were so short in early Burketown that the business people issued their own currency, dubbed "shinplaster" or "calabashers". These were in the form of IOU's hand printed on tissue paper so that they had as short a life as possible. In February 1866 Lieutenant Wentworth D'Arcy UHR with 8 troopers and accompanied by William Landsborough, the first Police Magistrate, rode into Burketown where everyone carried a pistol and where a successful shop keeper could ride well, shoot well and be an able pugilist.  The pioneer spirit was indomitable and the first official race meeting was held 25 July 1866 with prize money at $200 (sic).  In October 1868 Towns and Co traded wool, tallow, hides and skins between Sweers Island and Batavia.

Burketown Post Office opened on 1 July 1866, closed in 1871 and reopened in 1883.

In the same year, settlement of the region heavily impacted upon the sovereign Indigenous peoples. With their lands stolen and hunting grounds denied, local Aboriginal peoples hunted the horses of the settlers. Retribution by the settlers was enacted under Sub Inspector Uhr and was assisted by the arrival of the Queensland Native Police. A massacre of 30 Aboriginal people took place after 12 horses were killed. A further 29 Aboriginal people were murdered shortly afterwards by shooting and bludgeoning. As the Burketown correspondent of the Port Dennison Times reported on 4 June 1868, "everybody in the district is delighted with the wholesale slaughter dealt out by the native police". The newspaper paid "thanks" to those involved in "ridding the district of fifty-nine (59) myalls" or local Aboriginal people.

Burketown was used by explorer Francis Cadell as a staging point for refitting and refuelling the steamer Eagle and collecting mail and fresh supplies during his 1867–68 survey of the Northern Territory coastline.

At first, hopes the town would develop into a major settlement in north-western Queensland were high. However, from 1866 tropical diseases ravaged the population. The vessel "Margaret and Mary" from Sydney came into port rife with "Gulf Fever" (never properly identified, but thought to be either malaria or typhoid). Estimates of the numbers who died vary from 25 to 100 people. The majority of the crew and passengers of ship including the captain's wife died. Many of the dead were buried in a mass grave in Burketown Cemetery. Landsborough evacuated the survivors to Sweers Island for a period of 18 months, where a further two died and were buried on the island. 

At the first land sales in the town on 14 August 1867, 75 allotments were sold.

The town was devastated by a tropical cyclone on 5 March 1887 which flooded almost all of Burketown. Only the highest part of town, near where the Council Office is currently located, escaped the waters from the Gulf of Carpentaria. A copy of a 1918 report to the Queensland Parliament from the Department of Harbours and Rivers Engineers refers to the sea rising to 5.5 metres above the highest spring tide level at the Albert River Heads. This level is about 8 metres above Australian Height Datum. Seven people of the population of 138 died in the cyclone.

Burketown State School opened on 26 April 1888.

The Burketown Hotel, established in 1920 in a building originally used as the customs bond store, was destroyed by fire in 2012. The Albert Hotel building, originally the Burketown customs house is believed to date from the 1860s. Another famous Burketown Hotel, the Commonwealth, was built in around 1926, but was also destroyed by fire in 1954.

20th century 
Burketown's population peaked at 265 in 1911.

21st century 
At the 2006 census, Burketown had a population of 173.

On 22 March 2012, the 92-year-old pub was destroyed in an early morning fire. The pub was subsequently rebuilt.

Heritage listings 
Burketown has a number of heritage-listed sites, including:

 Landsborough Tree

 Former Burketown Post Office, Musgrave Street
 Boiling Down Works, Truganinni Road

Climate 
 
Burketown has a semi-arid climate (Köppen BSh), though closely bordering on a tropical savanna climate (Aw), characterised by hot, humid summers with erratic rainfall and warm, extremely dry winters. Flooding, often associated with the passage of a tropical cyclone, often isolates the community for months, whilst failure of the summer rains can be extreme — for instance in the 1901/1902 wet season no more than  fell and the drought caused the death of millions of cattle.

Morning glory cloud 

The Morning Glory has become something of a "mecca" for soaring pilots who surf the giant atmospheric wave in their gliders. Gliding flights of over  have become common.

Education
Burketown State School is a government primary (Prep-6) school for boys and girls at Beames Street.  In 2017, the school had an enrolment of 23 students with 3 teachers and 5 non-teaching staff (3 full-time equivalent). In 2018, the school had an enrolment of 27 students with 3 teachers and 7 non-teaching staff (4 full-time equivalent).

There are no secondary schools in Burketown. The closest secondary schools are in Normanton, 227 kilometres (141 mi) to the east and Mount Isa, 425 kilometres (264 mi) to the south. There are also opportunities for students to complete their education by way of boarding school or via the Mt Isa School of Distance Education.

Facilities 
Burketown has a post office, council office, service station, small general stores/ take-away shops, bakery and butcher caravan park, outpost hospital and a hotel.

It is serviced by the Royal Flying Doctor Service from Mount Isa Base. The Burke Shire Council operate the Burketown Airport which has a regular passenger service from Regional Express Airlines and is also the primary base of Savannah Aviation, which provides aircraft charter services throughout the Gulf, far north/western Queensland and the Northern Territory.

Burketown Police Station is in Gregory Street.

Burketown SES Facility is on the south-east corner of Musgrave Street and Beames Street.

Burketown Primary Health Care Clinic is a small public hospital on Truganini Road. Burketown Ambulance Station is at the health centre.

Burketown Cemetery is on an unnamed road immediately north of the hospital on Truganini Road.

The sewage treatment plant is off to the north of the Wills Developmental Road. The water treatment plant is to the north-west of the sewage treatment plant. These are operated by the Burke Shire Council.

Amenities 
The Burke Shire Council operates a public library at Lot 65, Musgrave Street.

There is a barge/boat ramp with jetty and pontoon on Truganina Road on the north bank of the Albert River. It is managed by the Burke Shire Council.

Attractions 
Burketown is known as the Barramundi capital of Australia and holds an annual Barramundi Fishing Competition during Easter.

In culture
Burketown is believed to be the basis of “Willstown” (named after Burke's fellow explorer Wills) in the novel A Town Like Alice by Nevil Shute. In the novel, the town has little in the way of amenities and is developed into a successful and growing community to become a town like Alice Springs.

References

External links 
 

 Burke Shire Council
 Sydney Morning Herald: Burketown
 Morning Glory Cloud Meteorology
 Morning Glory Cloud Video
 Video of Burketown and the Gulf from the air
Queensland Places - Burketown - John Oxley Library blog, State Library of Queensland

Towns in Queensland
North West Queensland
Gulf of Carpentaria
Shire of Burke
1865 establishments in Australia
Populated places established in 1865
Burketown
Localities in Queensland